Abary is a small community in the Mahaica-Berbice Region of Guyana, near the mouth of the Abary River, 43 miles from Georgetown. Abary is known for the Abary Bridge located on the Main Highway. The bridge was originally a railway bridge and has a very steep ascend. The bridge was designed by Joseph Walter Holder who also built the Demerara Harbour Bridge.

References

Populated places in Mahaica-Berbice